Electoral history of Cynthia McKinney, Democratic Representative from Georgia 11th and 4th congressional district (1993–2003, 2003–2005), and 2008 Green Party Presidential nominee.

Congressional races

1992 election

1994 election

1996 election

1998 election

2000 election

2002 election

2004 election

2006 election

2012 election

Presidential races
Peace and Freedom Party presidential primary in California, 2008:
Ralph Nader - 2,543 (40.00%)
Cynthia McKinney - 1,353 (21.28%)
Gloria La Riva - 1,335 (21.00%)
Brian Moore - 346 (5.44%)
John R. Crockford - 339 (5.33%)
Stewart Alexander - 335 (5.27%)
Stanley Martin Hetz - 107 (1.68%)

Peace and Freedom Party Convention (Presidential tally), 2008:
Ralph Nader - 46 (51.69%)
Gloria La Riva - 27 (30.34%)
Brian Moore - 10 (11.24%)
Cynthia McKinney - 6 (6.74%)

Green Party National Convention, 2008:
Cynthia McKinney - 324 (59.56%)
Ralph Nader - 78 (14.34%)
Kat Swift - 39 (7.17%)
Kent P. Mesplay - 35 (6.43%)
Jesse Johnson - 33 (6.07%)
Elaine Brown - 9 (1.65%)
Jared Ball - 8 (1.47%)
Howie Hawkins - 8 (1.47%)
None of the above - 7 (1.29%)
Uncommitted - 2 (0.37%)
Undecided - 1 (0.18%)

Green Party 2008 ticket:
Former Representative Cynthia McKinney of Georgia for President: 161,603 votes
Activist Rosa Clemente of New York for Vice President

References

See also

Cynthia McKinney presidential campaign, 2008
Political positions of Cynthia McKinney
Electoral history of Bob Barr (Libertarian nominee)
Electoral history of Barack Obama (Democratic nominee)
Electoral history of John McCain (Republican nominee)
Electoral history of Ralph Nader (Independent candidate)

Cynthia McKinney
McKinney, Cynthia